HD 221776 is a double star in the northern constellation of Andromeda. With an apparent visual magnitude of 6.18, it is viewable by the naked eye user very favourable conditions. The most luminous component has a spectral classification K5III, meaning that it is an orange giant star that has evolved off the main sequence. An infrared excess has been detected around this star, indicating the star is associated with a cloud of dust particles.

There is a magnitude 11.8 companion at angular separation of 19.8″ along a position angle of 329°, as of 2002; however, its distance measured by parallax yields a much greater distance than the primary star.

References

External links
 Image HD 221776

Andromeda (constellation)
221776
Double stars
K-type giants
8950
116365
Durchmusterung objects